Myripristis adusta, common name shadowfin soldierfish, is a species of soldierfish belonging to the family Holocentridae.

Description
This species grows to a length of  TL. The body is oval and laterally compressed and the scales are quite large. The eyes are large, as this fish is mainly nocturnal. The basic colour is pale pink, with deep blue to black scale margins. Median and caudal fins show a broad deep blue to black outer border. These fishes usually aggregate in small groups, often in mixed-species and mainly feed on plankton.

Distribution
Myripristis berndti is widespread in the Indian and Pacific Oceans.

Habitat

References

Fish Base

External links
 

adusta
Fish of Palau
Fish described in 1853